Phos Hilaron is an ancient Christian hymn originally written in Koine Greek. Often referred to in the Western Church by its Latin title Lumen Hilare, it has been translated into English as O Gladsome Light. It is the earliest known Christian hymn recorded outside of the Bible that is still in use today. The hymn is part of vespers in the Byzantine Rite and the Catholic Church, and also included in some Anglican and Lutheran liturgies.

Origins 
The hymn was first recorded by an unknown author in the Apostolic Constitutions, which was written in the late 3rd or early 4th century. It is found in a collection of songs to be sung in the morning, in the evening, before meals, and at candle lighting. Phos Hilaron is to be sung at the lighting of lamps in the evening and so is sometimes known as the “Lamp-lighting Hymn”. Despite some of the words to the other three songs being from Scripture or in one case dated to around 150, Phos Hilaron is the first to be considered an actual hymn in the modern sense. It is certainly the first complete example. It is far more rhythmic than the others and is divided into twelve verses varying between five, six, eight, nine, ten and eleven syllables a verse. Basil of Caesarea (329–379) spoke of the singing of the Phos Hilaron as a cherished tradition of the church, the hymn being already considered old in his day (though some attribute the composition of the song to Basil himself). The original melody, as used by the Greek Orthodox Church in the original text, is considered taxing on the voice as it spans almost two octaves, with the voice peaking on the words “Heavenly” and “the Father” (see word painting).

At that time in Jerusalem, a lamp was kept perpetually burning in the empty tomb of Christ, its glow a symbol of the living light of Jesus. As Christians gathered to worship the hymn was sung and, in a tradition known as the lighting of the lamps, a candle lit from the lamp was brought forth from the tomb, its bright, solitary flame calling the church to celebrate the Risen Lord.

Saint Athenogenes, a saint of unknown date but whose saint's day is 16 July, is believed by some (including Basil) to have composed this hymn on the way to being martyred. He is often depicted as an elderly bishop with the executioner's arm paralyzed until the saint has completed his song.  The Roman Martyrology states: “In Pontus, the birthday of Saint Athenogenes, [is celebrated. He was] an aged theologian, who, when about to consummate his martyrdom by fire, sang a hymn of joy, which he left in writing to his disciples.” He is probably identical to the bishop who was martyred with ten disciples in Sebaste, Armenia, on July 16 during the reign of Emperor Diocletian, most probably ca. A.D. 305.

Sophronius of Jerusalem (560− 638), who was known for his poetry, is believed to have revised the hymn and Orthodox liturgical books often identify him as the author, e.g., in the Slavonic text below.

Modern usage

Orthodox Christianity 
The hymn is a fixed part of the Orthodox vespers service, sung or recited daily, at the entrance when great vespers is celebrated and, in all cases, after the "lamp lighting psalms", aka, "Lord, I have cried..." and their stichera and immediately preceding the prokeimenon.

Armenian Rite 
In the Armenian Rite the hymn is sung only on Saturday evening (i.e., Sunday Eve) and on the eve of certain feast days. The name of the text in Armenian is Loys Zvart.

Anglicanism 
The hymn was translated into English meter by John Keble, one of the leaders of the Oxford Movement within Anglicanism, in 1834, as "Hail, Gladdening Light". Because Keble retained the original irregular metre, it was not suited to any existing hymn tune; however, Sir John Stainer wrote music specifically for it based on Anglican chant. His tune, Sebaste, was first published in 1875 in Hymns Ancient and Modern, while Stainer was organist at St Paul's Cathedral, London. Keble's version was also set as an anthem for eight voices by Charles Wood in 1912. Another translation was made by the 19th-century U.S. poet Henry Wadsworth Longfellow; a third translation, by Robert Bridges, has appeared in several hymnals with music  composed by Louis Bourgeois.

The traditional Anglican service of Evening Prayer did not call for the use of the hymn, though any of these versifications might be sung at those points in the service which provided for the singing of a hymn or anthem. More recently, some Anglican bodies have adopted it as part of the evening liturgy. For example, the 1979 American Book of Common Prayer prescribes it, in the prose translation given below, as an optional invitatory canticle immediately preceding the psalms appointed for the day.

Lutheranism 

The Lutheran Service Book (of the Missouri Synod, 2006) contains, for the early evening prayer, the Phos Hilaron. The prayer book suggests that a candle may be lighted before singing the Phos Hilaron.

Lyrics

Greek 
Original text

Transliteration (into reconstructed Classical Greek pronunciation as opposed to that of the time period in which it was written)

Verbatim translation
O Light gladsome of the holy glory of the Immortal Father,
the Heavenly, the Holy, the Blessed, O Jesus Christ,
having come upon the setting of the sun, having seen the light of the evening,
we praise the Father, the Son, and the Holy Spirit: God.
Worthy it is at all times to praise Thee in joyful voices,
O Son of God, Giver of Life, for which the world glorifies Thee.

Arabic

Classical Armenian 
The Classical Armenian text, taken from the Zhamagirk', the Armenian Book of Hours, is:

An approximate transliteration, taking into account modern Armenian pronunciation:

A somewhat literal English translation of this text is:

Alleluia, Alleluia. Joyous, holy light of the glory of the immortal, heavenly, holy, vivifying Father: Jesus Christ. Having come to the setting of the sun, we have seen this evening light. Let us praise the Father, the Son, and the Holy Spirit of God, and together let us say, "Amen." Make us worthy for all time to bless with a voice, with a song, the name of glory of the all-holy Trinity who has given life, and for which the world glorifies thee.

Church Slavonic

Old Church Slavonic

Russian Church Slavonic 

The top line (in red) translates as "The Work of Sophronius, Patriarch of Jerusalem."

Transliteration into modern Russian letters:

Georgian

English

Eastern Orthodox

Orthodox Church in America 
O Gladsome Light of the Holy Glory of the Immortal Father, Heavenly, Holy, Blessed Jesus Christ! Now that we have come to the setting of the sun and see the light of evening, we praise God Father, Son and Holy Spirit. For meet it is at all times to worship Thee with voices of praise. O Son of God and Giver of Life, therefore all the world doth glorify Thee.

Russian Orthodox Church Outside Russia 
O Gentle Light of the holy glory of the immortal, heavenly, holy, blessed Father, O Jesus Christ: Having come to the setting of the sun, having beheld the evening light, we praise the Father, the Son, and the Holy Spirit: God.  Meet it is for Thee at all times to be hymned with reverent voices, O Son of God, Giver of life.  Wherefore, the world doth glorify Thee.

Another Orthodox translation 
O Gladsome Light of the holy glory / of the Immortal Father, / heavenly, holy, blessed, O Jesus Christ.

Having Come to sunset / and beholding the evening light, we hymn the Father, Son, and Holy Spirit: God.

Meet it is at all times that thou be hymned / with fitting voices, O Son of God, thou Giver of Life; wherefore the world doth glorify thee.

Another Orthodox translation

Eastern Catholic

Melkite Catholic Church 
O Joyful Light of the holy glory of the Father immortal: heavenly, holy, blessed Lord Jesus Christ! Since we have come to the setting of the sun and have seen the evening light, we praise God the Father, the Son and the Holy Spirit. It is proper for You to be praised at all times by fitting melodies, O Son of God, giver of life. Therefore, all the world glorifies You!

Ruthenian Catholic Church 
O Joyful Light of the holy glory of the Father Immortal, the heavenly, holy, blessed One, O Jesus Christ, now that we have reached the setting of the sun, and see the evening light, we sing to God, Father, Son, and Holy Spirit (+). It is fitting at all times to raise a song of praise in measured melody to you, O Son of God, the Giver of Life. Therefore, the universe sings your glory.

Ukrainian Catholic Church 
O Joyful Light, light and holy glory of the Father Immortal, the heavenly, holy, blessed One, O Jesus Christ, now that we have reached the setting of the sun, and see the evening light, we sing to God, Father, Son, and Holy Spirit (+). It is fitting at all times to raise a song of praise in measured melody to you, O Son of God, the Giver of Life. Behold, the universe sings your glory.

Sundry others

Book of Common Prayer (1979) 
O gracious Light,
pure brightness of the everliving Father in heaven,
O Jesus Christ, holy and blessed!

Now as we come to the setting of the sun,
and our eyes behold the vesper light,
we sing thy praises, O God: Father, Son, and Holy Spirit.

[Thou art/You are] worthy at all times to be praised by happy voices,
O Son of God, O Giver of life,
and to be glorified through all the worlds.

Lutheran Church–Missouri Synod 
Joyous light of glory of the immortal Father,
Heavenly, holy, blessed Jesus Christ,
We have come to the setting of the Sun
And we look to the evening light.
We sing to God, the Father, Son and Holy Spirit.
You are worthy of being praised with pure voices forever.
O Son of God, O Giver of life,
The universe proclaims your glory.

by John Keble 

Hail, gladdening Light, of His pure glory poured
Who is the immortal Father, heavenly, blest,
Holiest of Holies, Jesus Christ our Lord!

Now we are come to the sun’s hour of rest;
The lights of evening round us shine;
We hymn the Father, Son, and Holy Spirit divine!

Worthiest art Thou at all times to be sung
With undefiled tongue,
Son of our God, Giver of life, alone:
Therefore in all the world Thy glories, Lord, they own.

by Robert Bridges 
O gladsome light, O grace
Of God the Father's face,
The eternal splendour wearing;
Celestial, holy, blest,
Our Saviour Jesus Christ,
Joyful in thine appearing.

Now, ere day fadeth quite,
We see the evening light,
Our wonted hymn outpouring;
Father of might unknown,
Thee, his incarnate Son,
And Holy Spirit adoring.

To thee of right belongs
All praise of holy songs,
O Son of God, Lifegiver;
Thee, therefore, O Most High,
The world doth glorify,
And shall exalt forever.

by William Storey 
Used in the Office of the Dead and at Evening Prayer.

O radiant light, O sun divine
Of God the Father's deathless face,
O image of the light sublime
That fills the heav'nly dwelling place.

O Son of God, the source of life,
Praise is your due by night and day;
Our happy lips must raise the strain
Of your esteemed and splendid name.

Lord Jesus Christ, as daylight fades,
As shine the lights of eventide,
We praise the Father with the Son,
The Spirit blest and with them one.

[Storey did not preserve the ancient text-order by which the doxology occurs in v. 2 rather than v. 3]

Alternative version used in the Episcopal Church 
Light of the world in grace and beauty,
mirror of God's eternal face,
transparent flame of love's free duty,
you bring salvation to our race.
Now, as we see the lights of evening,
we raise our voice in hymns of praise;
worthy are you of endless blessing,
Sun of our night, Lamp of our days.

Georgian

Hungarian

Hungarian Greek Catholic Church 
Szelíd világossága
a szent és boldog
és halhatatlan mennyei Atya
isteni dicsőségének: Jézus Krisztus!

Eljővén a napnak
lenyugovásához
és látván az estéli fényt,
áldjuk az Atya és Fiú
és Szent lélek Istent.

Mert Te méltó vagy
hogy minden időben
szent hangon énekeljünk
tenéked, Isten Fia,
ki életet adsz a világnak;
miért is ez a világ
dicsőít Téged.

Korean

Korean Orthodox Church

Korean Anglican Church

Latin 
Translation of Phos lilaron from Greek into Latin, titled  Lumen hilare and arranged for singing, found in Adrian Fortescue's Latin Hymns.

An alternative Latin rendition, much more literal, is as follows:

Polish 
Pogodna światłości Ojca świętej chwały,
Nieśmiertelnego Pana niebiosów i ziemi,
Jezu Chryste. Pod zachód dzień nam dobiegł cały,
 I gwiazdę już wieczorną oczami naszymi
Oglądamy w niebie, ku czci Twojej, Boże,
Ojcze, Synu, i Duchu świętości, śpiewamy,
Boś godzien jest, o Panie, by o każdej porze,
Głoszono Twoją chwałę zbożnymi pieśniami,
O wielki Synu Boży, Tyś życia szafarzem,
Przeto Ci świat pieśń chwały
wdzięcznie składa w darze.

Portuguese

Lusitanian Church (Anglican Communion)

Romanian Orthodox

Welsh 
Translation by David Lewis (ap Ceredigion) 1870–1948

Musical settings

With on-line notes or audio

Other 
 St Gabriel by Rev. Sir F. A. G. Ouseley (1825–1889)
 Christ Church by Rev E. S. Medley (1838-19--)
 Свѣте тихій (Svyetye tikhiy) from Op. 52, All-Night Vigil, by Pyotr Ilyich Tchaikovsky (1840–1893)
 Evening Hymn by Sir Arthur Sullivan (1842–1900)
 Свѣте тихій (Svyetye tikhiy) Op. 23 No.3 by Alexander Gretchaninoff (1864–1956)
 Anthem by Charles Wood (1866–1926)
 Свѣте тихій (Svyetye tikhiy) from Op. 37, All-Night Vigil, by Sergei Rachmaninoff (1873–1943)
 Anthem by Geoffrey Shaw (1879–1943)
 Op.28 by Craig Sellar Lang (1891–1972)
 Phos Hilaron by Alexander Flood (1977-)
 Church Music – David Crowder Band, 2009
 O Gracious Light by Mason Shefa, 2012.

Commercial recordings 
 Sheet music for Lang's Op.28
 Listen to the Craig Sellar Lang version
 Listen to John Rutter conducting the Charles Wood composition
 Listen to the Chris Tomlin version

External links 

 Catholic Encyclopedia – Hymnology article
 Attributes the hymn to Basil, and mentions St Sophronius's revision
 Encyclopædia Britannica – claims it is as old as AD 200 or earlier.

References 

Greek Christian hymns